Cavalry Football Club, is a Canadian professional soccer club based in the Calgary metropolitan region of Alberta. The club competes at the top of the Canadian soccer league system in the Canadian Premier League, and plays their home matches at ATCO Field on the grounds of Spruce Meadows in Foothills County.

The team is managed by Tommy Wheeldon Jr. and owned by Spruce Meadows Sports & Entertainment.

History
On May 5, 2018, Calgary was one of four cities accepted by the Canadian Soccer Association for professional club membership.

Cavalry FC was announced on May 17, 2018, as the second team to officially join the Canadian Premier League. Spruce Meadows Sports & Entertainment Group CEO Linda Southern-Heathcott and COO Ian Allison were joined by league commissioner David Clanachan and league president Paul Beirne to unveil the team.

The club's name, crest and colours were all revealed at the event at Spruce Meadows, while Tommy Wheeldon Jr. was announced as head coach and general manager. Plans to renovate existing facilities at Spruce Meadows, resulting in a soccer-specific stadium with a capacity of at least 5,000 seats, were also revealed.

On June 26, 2019, Cavalry FC qualified for the 2019 Canadian Premier League Championship by winning the inaugural CPL Spring season. The following month the Cavs became the first CPL club to defeat a Major League Soccer club in the Canadian Championship by upsetting Vancouver Whitecaps FC in 2019 over two-legs.

Goalkeeper Marco Carducci became the first CPL player called up to the Canada men's national soccer team when, on August 28, 2019, he was requested for a pair of Nations League A matches against Cuba.

Colours and crest 
The team's crest was designed by Jon Rogers. The crest features a chevron in homage to the Lord Strathcona's Horse armoured regiment, Alberta Foothills and Rocky Mountains, and a football to represent the past and future of Calgary as a sporting city.

The club's colours are green, red and black (branded by the club as "army green," "Calgary red," and "black on black"). These colours symbolize the green of Calgary's nature and Spruce Meadows, and the red and black of other Calgary sports teams and the flag of Lord Strathcona's Horse.

Stadium

Cavalry FC play at ATCO Field, a 6,000-seat stadium located at Spruce Meadows, at the 'Meadows on the Green' equestrian ring. The stadium is modular to allow for future growth and uses natural grass. Free shuttles bring fans to the stadium from the Somerset–Bridlewood CTrain station. In September 2019, Spruce Meadows presented a new area plan to Foothills County, that includes a 12,000 seat soccer-specific stadium on the grounds that would replace ATCO Field over the next 30 years.

Club culture

Supporters
Cavalry FC are supported by the Foot Soldiers, a supporters group that originally formed in 2015 to support USL League Two club Calgary Foothills and the Calgary Foothills UWS team.

Rivalries
Al Classico

The Al Classico existed with FC Edmonton as a geographical rivalry between the two Alberta-based clubs in the Canadian Premier League. The rivalry is part of a larger sporting rivalry between teams based in Calgary and Edmonton; the two largest cities in the province.  The Wildrose Cup was awarded annually to the team that wins the most points from the series in league play (excluding 2020 due to the COVID-19 pandemic), which Cavalry won each year until FC Edmonton ceased operations in 2022.

Cavalry FC–Forge FC rivalry

The Cavalry FC–Forge FC rivalry developed during the 2019 spring season as the two top clubs in the league. The rivalry bled into the 2019 Canadian Championship in which Cavalry defeated Forge 3–2 over two legs on aggregate. The first leg, which resulted in a 1–1 draw, ended with heated altercations between both sides on the pitch, leading to a disciplinary review by the Canadian Soccer Association.

Honours

Canadian Premier League playoffs
Runners-up: 2019
Canadian Premier League regular season
Champions (1): 2019

Players and staff

Roster

Staff

Head coaches

Club captains

Record

Year-by-year 

1. Average attendance include statistics from league matches only.
2. Top goalscorer(s) includes all goals scored in league season, league playoffs, Canadian Championship, CONCACAF League, and other competitive continental matches.

References

External links 

 
2018 establishments in Alberta
Association football clubs established in 2018
Soccer clubs in Calgary
Canadian Premier League teams